Veronica Small-Eastman is a Democratic Party member of the Montana House of Representatives, representing District 42 since 2002.

External links
Montana House of Representatives – Veronica Small-Eastman official MT State Legislature website
Project Vote Smart – Representative Veronica Small-Eastman (MT) profile
Follow the Money – Veronica Small-Eastman
2006 2004 2002 Montana House campaign contributions

Democratic Party members of the Montana House of Representatives
1941 births
Crow tribe
Living people
Women state legislators in Montana
People from Lodge Grass, Montana
21st-century American women